KCRP may refer to:

 the ICAO airport code for Corpus Christi International Airport
 KCRP-CD, a television station (channel 17, virtual 41) licensed to Corpus Christi, Texas, United States